The 2006 FORU Cup was an international rugby union competition for countries and territories from Oceania with national teams in the developmental band. It was run by the Federation of Oceania Rugby Unions, which is the administrative body for rugby in the Oceania region.

Teams competing included Niue, Tahiti, Cook Islands, and Vanuatu. The final was never played.



First round

Western Zone 

Ranking
 1.  Qualified for final
 2.

Eastern Zone 

Ranking:
 1.  
 2.  Qualified for final?
 3.

See also
 FORU Oceania Cup

References

FORU Oceania Cup
Oceania
FORU